Head First is the third album by the Babys. Internal conflicts led to founder, guitarist and keyboard player Michael Corby being removed from the group by Chrysalis on 28 August 1978. The three remaining members—John Waite, Wally Stocker and Tony Brock—completed the album for a December 1978 release. Head First peaked at number 18 on the Australian chart.

Album information
Lead single status was afforded to "Every Time I Think of You," a track completed without Corby, who was friends with the tune's composers, Jack Conrad and Ray Kennedy, the team responsible for the Babys' previous Top 40 hit "Isn't It Time."  "Every Time I Think of You" matched the Billboard Hot 100 No. 13 peak of "Isn't It Time" in April 1979, the same month that Head First became the Babys' highest charting album with a No. 22 peak on the Billboard albums chart. After serving as the B-side for "Every Time I Think of You," the title track "Head First" was issued as the A-side of the follow-up single with another album track, "California" as B-side; this single reached No. 77 on the Hot 100.

Head First was reissued on 26 May 2009 under Rock Candy Records after being out of print for many years. There are no bonus tracks, but all of the tracks have been remastered.

Track listing and personnel
Side One
 "Love Don't Prove I'm Right" (John Waite, Wally Stocker, Tony Brock) – 2:47
 John Waite - lead vocals
 Wally Stocker - guitars
 Tony Brock - drums, percussion
 "Every Time I Think of You" (Jack Conrad, Ray Kennedy) – 4:00
 John Waite - lead vocals
 Wally Stocker - guitars
 Tony Brock - drums, percussion
 Diana Lee - backing vocals
 Marti McCall - backing vocals
 Myrna Matthews - backing vocals
 Kevin Kelly - piano
 Jack Conrad - bass
 "I Was One" (Waite, Mike Japp) – 3:30
 John Waite - bass, lead vocals
 Wally Stocker - guitars
 Tony Brock - drums, percussion
 Mike Japp - backing vocals
 "White Lightning" (Billy Nicholls) – 3:20
 John Waite - bass, lead vocals
 Wally Stocker - acoustic guitar
 Tony Brock - drums, percussion
 Michael Corby - organ
 John Sinclair - synthesizer
 "Run to Mexico" (Waite, Stocker, Mike Corby, Brock) – 4:35
 John Waite - bass, lead vocals
 Wally Stocker - guitars
 Tony Brock - drums, percussion
 Michael Corby - keyboards
Side Two
 "Head First" (Waite, Stocker, Brock) – 3:57
 John Waite - bass, lead vocals
 Wally Stocker - guitars
 Tony Brock - drums, percussion
 "You (Got It)" (Waite) – 4:39
 John Waite - bass, lead vocals
 Wally Stocker - acoustic guitar
 Tony Brock - drums, percussion
 Michael Corby - piano
 "Please Don't Leave Me Here" (Waite, Corby, Stocker) – 5:08
 John Waite - bass, vocals
 Wally Stocker - guitars
 Tony Brock - drums, vocals, percussion
 Michael Corby - piano
 "California" (Waite) – 4:00
 John Waite - bass, lead vocals
 Wally Stocker - acoustic guitars, guitars
 Tony Brock - drums, percussion
 Michael Corby- Hammond organ
 Robb Lawrence - mandolin
 John Sinclair - synthesizer
 Bobbye Hall - percussion

Personnel

Band
 John Waite: bass, lead vocals 
 Walter Stocker: lead guitar
 Tony Brock: drums

Additional personnel
Michael Corby: rhythm guitar, keyboards
Jack Conrad: bass
Kevin Kelly: piano
Allan MacMillan - string and horn arrangements
Jimmie Haskell: string and  horn arrangement on "Every Time I Think of You"
Marti McCall, Myrna Mathews, Dianna Lee: backing vocals
John Sinclair: synthesizer (4)

Certifications

References

1978 albums
The Babys albums
Albums arranged by Jimmie Haskell
Albums produced by Ron Nevison
Chrysalis Records albums